The 1995–96 New Jersey Nets season was the Nets' 29th season in the National Basketball Association, and 20th season in East Rutherford, New Jersey. The Nets received the ninth pick in the 1995 NBA draft, and selected NCAA Final Four MVP, Ed O'Bannon out of UCLA. In the off-season, the team signed free agent Vern Fleming. Derrick Coleman missed the first month of the season due to an irregular heartbeat. He was soon traded along with Rex Walters, and Sean Higgins to the Philadelphia 76ers in exchange for Shawn Bradley, Greg Graham and Tim Perry, as the Nets won four of their next five games after the trade, leading to a 9–9 start. In January, they dealt Kenny Anderson to the Charlotte Hornets in exchange for Kendall Gill, and second-year guard Khalid Reeves. However, Gill would be out for the remainder of the season with a hand injury after only playing just eleven games, while Kevin Edwards only played just 34 games due to a knee injury. The Nets held an 18–29 record at the All-Star break, and lost 12 of their final 14 games to finish sixth in the Atlantic Division with a 30–52 record.

Armen Gilliam averaged 18.3 points and 9.1 rebounds per game, while Bradley averaged 12.5 points, 7.9 rebounds and 3.7 blocks per game with the Nets after being traded, and second-year guard Chris Childs showed improvement, providing the team with 12.8 points and 7.0 assists per game. In addition, P.J. Brown provided with 11.3 points and 6.9 rebounds per game, while Edwards contributed 11.6 points and 1.6 steals per game. Off the bench, Jayson Williams had an increased role as the team's sixth man, averaging 9.0 points and leading the Nets with 10.0 rebounds per game, while finishing in third place in Sixth Man of the Year voting, and Fleming contributed 7.7 points and 3.3 assists per game. O'Bannon failed to live up to expectations in his professional career, as he averaged just 6.2 points per game and started in 29 out of 64 games.

Following the season, head coach Butch Beard was fired after publicly criticizing his players, while Gilliam signed as a free agent with the Milwaukee Bucks, Childs signed with the New York Knicks, Brown signed with the Miami Heat, Rick Mahorn re-signed with his former team, the Detroit Pistons, Graham was traded to the Seattle SuperSonics, Perry was released to free agency, and Fleming retired.

Draft picks

Roster

Roster notes
 Center Shawn Bradley holds American and German dual citizenship. He was born in Germany and raised in the U.S., but represented Germany internationally.

Regular season

Season standings

z – clinched division title
y – clinched division title
x – clinched playoff spot

Record vs. opponents

Game log
{| class="toccolours" width=90% style="clear:both; margin:1.5em auto; text-align:center;"
|-
! colspan=2 style="background:#0C479D; color:#FFFFFF" | 1995–96 game log
Total: 30–52 (Home: 20–21; Road: 10–31)

|- style="background:#fcc;"
| 1
| November 3
| @ Toronto
| L 79–94
| Anderson & Gilliam (13)
| Armen Gilliam (16)
| Kenny Anderson (8)
| SkyDome33,306
| 0–1
|- style="background:#cfc;"
| 2
| November 7
| Portland
| W 104–84
| Armen Gilliam (16)
| Jayson Williams (16)
| Kenny Anderson (10)
| Brendan Byrne Arena16,152
| 1–1
|- style="background:#fcc;"
| 3
| November 8
| @ Orlando
| L 122–130 (3OT)
| Armen Gilliam (20)
| P. J. Brown (12)
| Kenny Anderson (7)
| Brendan Byrne Arena16,152
| 1–2
|- style="background:#fcc;"
| 4
| November 10
| @ Miami
| L 80–106
| Childs & Gilliam (12)
| Armen Gilliam (11)
| Chris Childs (6)
| Brendan Byrne Arena16,152
| 1–2

Player statistics

Regular season

Player Statistics Citation:

Awards and records

Transactions

References

See also
 1995–96 NBA season

New Jersey Nets season
New Jersey Nets seasons
New Jersey Nets
New Jersey Nets
20th century in East Rutherford, New Jersey
Meadowlands Sports Complex